The Ashgabat Stadium is a multi-purpose stadium in Ashgabat, Turkmenistan. It is currently used mostly for celebrations and football matches. The stadium holds 20,000 people and was built in 2011.

History 
In 2009, on behalf of President of Turkmenistan Gurbanguly Berdimuhamedow allocated funding for construction of a multipurpose stadium for events by 20 thousand seats. Construction led the Turkish company Polimeks. Opening of the stadium Ashgabat was held on 28 October 2011. The opening of the sports complex was attended by President of Turkmenistan Gurbanguly Berdimuhamedow. The opening ceremony on the new stadium was a big colorful presentation devoted to the Independence Day of Turkmenistan. All completed with traditional long colorful fireworks.

Overview 
In sports complex housed a football field with artificial turf, around which been laid athletics running track with tartan surface, sectors for the long jump, height, as well as a platform for gymnastic competitions and training. The building of the stadium are 17 practice rooms for various sports.

In the basement of stadium situated a tennis court, gym for volleyball, basketball, badminton, bowling halls with herbal tea room, individual strength training, gym general purpose, indoor jogging track, swimming pools for adults and children, room for doping control and medical center, same place located rooms for coaches, referees, match commissioner, massage rooms, showers, changing rooms. For sports writers, TV reporters, photographers have press center, separate rooms for work, as well as room for press conferences, equipped with simultaneous translation booths.

On the ground floor - hall for table tennis, weightlifting, wrestling, boxing with Olympic rings, gymnastics, physical education and fitness, dance, shaping, costume for artists, ticket offices, restaurants and shops. It also provides ramps for wheelchairs and prams.

The first and second floor are occupied by stands and cafeteria, medical cabinets, cupboards, offices. Here is located exhibition gallery, an internet cafe and videohall for children, as well as a medical center for athletes. One of the sectors placed under CIP and VIP grandstand.

On the third floor are booths television services.

The sports complex include a playground for karting sessions, open the training grounds for football, volleyball, basketball and four tennis courts, indoor and outdoor parking lot for 1252 cars.

Lighting arena complies FIFA (2000 lux).

References

External links
 Ashgabat Stadium. Polimeks

Football venues in Turkmenistan
Multi-purpose stadiums in Turkmenistan
Buildings and structures in Ashgabat
Event venues established in 2011
2011 establishments in Turkmenistan